Wei Wei (March 6, 1920 – August 24, 2008), originally known as Hong Jie, was a Chinese poet, a prose writer, a literary report writer, a journalist, a vice-editor-in-chief and the editor of various newspapers in China. His works are noted for their themes of patriotism, communism, and nationalism. Apart from using the name Wei Wei, he once used the pen name Hong Yangshu  in some of his publications. He changed his name from Hong Jie to Wei Wei in 1937 when he had started a new page of his life, a political one.

Biography 
Wei Wei was born into a poor family in Zhengzhou, Henan, and received a rudimentary primary education. He showed early interest in calligraphy and literature, but was unable to receive much education after elementary school, when both of his parents died. He was largely self-taught and was greatly influenced by the radical Chinese literature of the 1920s and 30s, including works by authors like Lu Xun and Mao Dun.

Wei Wei joined the Eighth Route Army at the outbreak of the Second Sino-Japanese War in 1937 and was educated to be a propagandist and journalist. After joining the Chinese Communist Party in 1938, he rose quickly through party ranks. He became known for reporting from the front lines, which continued throughout the Korean War and the Vietnam War. He also became known for composing a series of Communist-themed novels, short stories, and operas.

Wei died on August 24, 2008 in Beijing.

Works

Poetry 

() Huihui, You Wake Them Up!
() The Good Couple Song
() Evening of Zhangjiakou
() Go to Frontier
()(1945) The Northern Boundary Evening Song
()(1945) Sanhechuan

() The Good Brothers Song
() The Autumn Song
() A Hero's Bottom Line
()(1951) Two Years
() Dawn View
()(1963) Never Ending Collection

Prose

Fiction

Novels
In the East (1978)
The Earth's Red Flying Ribbon (1987)
Fire Phoenix (1997)
We Despise those Kinds of Chinese (1999)
My Friends (1956)

Novellas
The Old Chimney (1954)
Wei Wei Novella Collection (1982)
Wei Wei Novella Collection (Selected) (1991)

Short Stories
Angry Winds of the Sky (published with Bai Ai 白艾/ in 1952).
Volunteer Soldiers and Korean Girls (1952)

Screenplay
The Red Storm (published with Qian Xiaohui 錢小惠in 1956)

Opera
Conquer the Invaders (with Song Zhidi 宋之的 and Ding Yi 丁毅 in 1952)

Anthologies

The Flowers Are Opened for the Warriors (1956)
Journal of the Strong People (1980)
Collection Book (1985)

Non-fiction

Essays
 Who are the Most Beloved People? (1951)
Fighting in the Yansu Cliff (1939)
Wangtuling Fighting Journal (1939)
We Really Missed It (1949)
The Earth and My Country
Be Proud, My Country
Young People Let Your Youth be more Beautiful (1951)
The Days and Nights of the Southern Shores of Han River (1951)
Spring Time (1954)
The Summer Three Titles (1954)
Blessings Goes to the People (1954)
The Road Sign (1954)
Moving forward in the Happy Sounds of the Drum
In Quick Water
Missing Xiaochuan
The New Long March

Biographies
 Deng Zhongxia Biography (with Qian Xiaohui in 1980)
 The Youth of Peng Dehuai (editor Yeng Ruiguang 楊瑞廣, in 1995)

Literary Reports
 (1944)
 Firings on the Plain (1945)
 (1945)
Move forward, My Country (1952)
 (1952)
The Female General (1958)
Chen Zhen Yi Poetry (1959)
 (1984)

Notes

References
 http://tools.shuku.net:8080/servlet/converter?url=http%3A%2F%2Fwww.shuku.net%2Fnovels%2Fmingjwx%2Ftvrqcmtsfds%2Fweiw00.html
 YangBing, TianYi, FangDong;Wei Wei Analysis 2000, Dangdai ZnongGuo ChuBanShe 
 Article written by Wei Wei about his book << 誰是最可愛的人 >>

http://www.cycnet.com/army/spot/yuanchao/001026001.htm

Further reading
 (1979)
 (2000)
 (2000)
(2000)

1920 births
2008 deaths
Deaths from cancer in the People's Republic of China
Deaths from liver cancer
Writers from Zhengzhou
People's Republic of China poets
Republic of China journalists
People's Republic of China journalists
Poets from Henan
20th-century poets
20th-century novelists
Mao Dun Literature Prize laureates
Chinese male novelists
Counter-Japanese Military and Political University alumni
20th-century Chinese male writers